John Maxwell (June 21, 1874 – November 13, 1931) was a fireman second class serving in the United States Navy during the Spanish–American War who received the Medal of Honor for bravery.

Biography
Maxwell was born June 21, 1874, in Scotland, and, after entering the navy was sent as a fireman second class to fight in the Spanish–American War aboard the U.S.S. Marblehead.

He died November 13, 1931, and is buried in Westbury Friends Cemetery Westbury, New York.

Medal of Honor citation
Rank and organization: Fireman Second Class, U.S. Navy. Born: 21 June 1874, Lanarkshire, Scotland, U.K. G.O. No.: 521, 7 July 1899.

Citation:

On board the U.S.S. Marblehead during the operation of cutting the cable leading from Cienfuegos, Cuba, 11 May 1898. Facing the heavy fire of the enemy, Maxwell displayed extraordinary bravery and coolness throughout this action.

Maxwell later was chauffeur to John Jacob Astor, a job he received through his good friend, Theodore Roosevelt.  Roosevelt finally received HIS citation in 2006 for his actions at Santiago, more commonly referred to as "San Juan Hill".

See also

List of Medal of Honor recipients for the Spanish–American War

References

External links

Original MOH awarded to John Maxwell

1874 births
1931 deaths
19th-century Irish people
United States Navy Medal of Honor recipients
United States Navy sailors
American military personnel of the Spanish–American War
British emigrants to the United States
Spanish–American War recipients of the Medal of Honor